Deoria Tal (also Devaria or Deoriya) is a lake about  from the villages of Mastura and Sari on the Ukhimath-Chopta road in the state of Uttarakhand in India. It is considered sacred by Hindus.

Access

Jeeps are available from Ukhimath to reach Sari, a nearby village, via Mastura village. For return journey, one can go down trekking to Mastura to get a shared jeep.

Alternately, one can trek  to Deoria Tal from Ukhimath. Even though, trekkers are no longer allowed to camp at the famous Deoriatal , there are options of jungle trekking, videography, etc. There are a couple of shops that sell tea and snacks, but these close at sundown. Trekkers usually combine this trek with the nearby trek to Tungnath (the highest Hindu shrine devoted to Lord Shiva) and Chandrashila, which are approached from Chopta.

Panoramic view

The lake is known for its wide 300° panorama. Mountains like Chaukhamba, Nilkantha, Bandarpunch, Kedar Range, and Kalanag can be viewed from here. There exists another route from Deoria Tal to Tungnath, which is mainly used for night camping, jungle trekking, etc.

In the Hindu faith
Hindu faith states that the Devas bathed in this lake, hence the name. The lake is also believed to be the "Indra Sarovar" referred to in the Puranas by wandering Hindu mendicants, Sadhus.
It is also believed that it was the place from where the mighty Pandavas were asked queries by Yaksha. According to the locals it was also said that this lake was built by Bheem, who was strongest among the Pandavas, to appease his thirst, and Yudhister, who was the wisest, suggested Bheem to build his own lake.

References

Lakes of Uttarakhand